Jacobus Petrus (Kosie) Marais (22 June 1900 – 8 April 1963), was the son of Jacobus Petrus (Kowie) Marais and Catharina Elizabeth (Kitty) Eksteen.  He was known for brandy-making.

Background 

Marais grew up on the farm Wonderfontein close to Robertson, Cape Colony. As a child in school his brother Eksteen (Johannes Eksteen) and he had a workshop and laboratory on the farm. In the workshop they generated electricity. In the laboratory they experiment with gunpowder. In 1921 Kosie had to stop his studies at Stellenbosch University and had to farm as his father Kowie was ill. His father died in 1922. Eksteen and Kosie became owners of the farms Klipdrift and Wonderfontein. His sister Judith Maria Magdalena, helped on the farm too. She later married a de Wet. His oldest brother, Ernst Jacobus, died young in 1918. Kosie operated on Klipdrift and Eksteen on Wonderfontein. On Klipdrift Kosie made brandy and liqueurs. In 1957 the two brothers split. Kosie got Klipdrift, and Eksteen Wonderfontein.  Kosie was a South African Freemason.

Brandy making 

Marais founded the company Southern Liqueur Company. He started to make Brandy.  S.E. Warren, a director of KWV encouraged him in 1935 to produce and market brandy. His brand were called Klipdrift (the name comes from the farm's name)
The first bottle was produced on 4 May 1938, at 8.02pm. On the farm Klipdrift two types of brandy were produced:

A five-year-old brandy and

A ten-year-old product.

He marketed it by sending a price-list to military officers' messes. He said it should be for “an officer and a gentleman”.

His company was sold to Castle Wine and Brandy Company after his death in 1963. This Company became part of Distell.

His brands has won awards and it's ranked as a brandy in South Africa and the world. It is still made to Marais's recipe.         Today his brandy is still sold in South Africa and other countries.

Other activities

Archeology 

Fritz Heese introduced Kosie to archeology. According to Major C.R Wolhuter, he and Kosie were the only two residents of Robertson, South Africa that were members of the Society to Promote Science. Kosie worked through the society as an archaeologist. He made contact with Henri Breuil. His theory was that tools made of stone that he found in the soil were older than the San people. He and Abbé Breuil took a trip to South West Africa and Bechuanaland. Breuil agreed with his theory. Kosie was made a member of the Archaeological Society.

Bisley Shooting (target shooting)  

He won the Governors-general trophy in the national competition in 1934. He was then chosen to represent South Africa.

Political career 

Kosie Marais and his family were members of the South African Party. Under the leadership of Adolph Malan (Sailor), he was part of old soldiers who formed on 30 June 1951, in Johannesburg, South Africa, the Torch Commando to pressure the government to stop the racial policy. The United Party ask him to stand for election in George, Western Cape, South Africa in 1948 against P.W. Botha (the later president of South Africa) of the National Party. The National Party won (retained) the ward.

Personal life 

He married Joyce le Roux from Franschhoek, South Africa in 1926. Out of the marriage four children were born:
Yvonne (married to Buirski), Valerie (married to Noli) Lynette (married to Lotz) and his only son Jeanniel Pierre Marais.

Burial 

He was buried on a hill from where he used to look out over his lands.
Kosie was commemorated in the name Major's Hill Winery. He held the rank of Major in the Union Defence Force. The War Medal and the Africa Service Medal were awarded to Marais.

References 

1900 births
1963 deaths
Stellenbosch University alumni
 South African Freemasons